Jon T. Pitts (born 1948) is an American mathematician working on geometric analysis and variational calculus. He is a professor at Texas A&M University.

Pitts obtained his Ph.D. from Princeton University in 1974 under the supervision of Frederick Almgren, Jr., with the thesis Every Compact Three-Dimensional Manifold Contains Two-Dimensional Minimal Submanifolds.

He received a Sloan Fellowship in 1981.

The Almgren–Pitts min-max theory is named after his teacher and him.

Selected publications
"Existence and regularity of minimal surfaces on Riemannian manifolds"
"Applications of minimax to minimal surfaces and the topology of 3-manifolds"
"Existence of minimal surfaces of bounded topological type in three-manifolds"

References

External links
Home page of Jon T. Pitts at the Texas A&M University
Tobias Colding & Camillo De Lellis: "The min-max construction of minimal surfaces"

1948 births
Living people
People from Austin, Texas
Princeton University alumni
Geometers
Variational analysts
Texas A&M University faculty
Sloan Research Fellows
20th-century American mathematicians
21st-century American mathematicians